Doorway to Fame is an American talent show broadcast on the now defunct DuMont Television Network. The series ran from May 2, 1947, to July 11, 1949.

Overview
The series used early television scene-blending technology to project the performers into cleverly constructed miniature sets or backdrops. Although 20,000 performers appeared on the series, it is widely reported that, contrary to the show's name, very few of the contestants went on to become famous. The series was cancelled in 1949.

Broadcast history
The series was hosted by Johnny Olson, who would go on to host the DuMont daytime variety show Johnny Olson's Rumpus Room from 1949 to 1952, and many other television series and game shows, including the Saturday morning children's show Kids and Company on DuMont from September 1951 to June 1952, with co-host Ham Fisher.

Regulars on the program included The Tophatters, described as "instrumentalists and novelty singers".

On May 15, 1948, announcer Joe Bolton left Doorway to Fame to start on WPIX-TV as announcer and weatherman.

The program, produced and distributed by DuMont, originally aired Friday nights at 7:30 pm EST on most DuMont affiliate stations. In October 1947, the schedule was changed to Monday nights at 7pm ET. In March 1949, the program moved to 8:30pm ET.

Episode status
Two kinescopes of the series survive at the UCLA Film and Television Archive. One of the surviving episodes featured up-and-coming traditional pop singer Toni Arden and African-American "novelty dance act" Cook & Brown along with other performers.

See also
List of programs broadcast by the DuMont Television Network
List of surviving DuMont Television Network broadcasts
1947-48 United States network television schedule
1948-49 United States network television schedule

Notes

References

Bibliography
David Weinstein, The Forgotten Network: DuMont and the Birth of American Television (Philadelphia: Temple University Press, 2004) 
Alex McNeil, Total Television, Fourth edition (New York: Penguin Books, 1980) 
Tim Brooks and Earle Marsh, The Complete Directory to Prime Time Network TV Shows, Third edition (New York: Ballantine Books, 1964)

External links

DuMont historical website

1947 American television series debuts
1949 American television series endings
1940s American television series
Black-and-white American television shows
DuMont Television Network original programming
English-language television shows
Talent shows